Yamal is a communication and broadcasting system developed and operated by Gazprom Space Systems. Born out of the connectivity needs of the natural gas extraction giant Gazprom, the system was spun off in its own company, and opened the network to third parties and even went into the public broadcasting industry. Yamal and Russian Satellite Communications Company (RSCC)'s Ekspress constellation are the only two national satellite operators in Russia.

History 
During 1997, even before the launch of their first satellites (Yamal 101 and Yamal 102), Gazkom was planning the second generation. At that time, they planned 24 satellites of the second generation. This extremely aggressive plan was scaled back by 2001 with a plan to launch four 200 series satellites. The first two, Yamal 201 and Yamal 202 planned to be launched by 2001 and the second pair, Yamal 203 and Yamal 204 by 2004. Yamal 201 and Yamal 203 were identical and be positioned at the 90° East orbital position and Yamal 202 and Yamal 204 were also twinned and be positioned at the 49° East position.

Yamal 101 and Yamal 102 were launched together on 6 September 1999 at 16:36:00 UTC from Baikonur Site 81/23 by a Proton-K / Blok DM-2M directly to geostationary orbit (GEO). But a failure in the electrical system at solar panel deployment meant that Yamal 101 was lost right after the successful launch. Thus, Gazkom registered Yamal 102 as Yamal 101. This has caused significant confusion but the records are clear that the satellite that failed was, in fact, the original Yamal 101.

Yamal 201 and Yamal 202 were launched on 24 November 2003 at 06:22:00 UTC from Baikonur Site 81/23 by a Proton-K / Blok DM-2M directly to geostationary orbit. The launch and satellite deployment was successful and both were commissioned into service.

By 2007, the program delays made Gazkom move to the Yamal 301 and Yamal 302 project, cancelling both Yamal 203 and Yamal 204. Those were more advanced versions of the spacecraft they would have to replace. But by early 2008, Energia and Gazkom enter into a disagreement over the cost and schedule of Yamal 301 and Yamal 302, which was even submitted to arbitrage. In the end, the contract with Energia is cancelled and a new Yamal-300K is hastily ordered from ISS Reshetnev for a 2009 launch date.

In February 2009, Gazprom Space Systems announced a contract with Thales Alenia Space for two satellites: Yamal-401 and Yamal-402. This was the first time a foreign supplier would build a satellite for domestic Russian market. After much lobby from Russian industry, the contract for the bus and integration of Yamal-401 is cancelled and awarded to ISS Reshetnev, but Thales is allowed to keep the payload supply.

Yamal 102, on 9 August 2010, was decommissioned and sent to a graveyard orbit. The satellite lasted 4079 days (11 years and 2 months), a bit short of the design life of 12.5 years.

Yamal-300K was launched along Luch 5B 2 November 2012, at 21:04:00 UTC from Baikonur Site 81/23 by a Proton-M / Briz-M directly to geostationary orbit. The launch and satellite deployment was successful and Yamal-300K was commissioned into service.

On 8 December 2012, at 13:13:43 UTC, a Proton-M / Briz-M launches Yamal-402 to a geostationary transfer orbit (GTO). The same day, Khrunichev State Research and Production Space Center and International Launch Services (ILS) reported an anomaly during the launch in which the Briz-M stage failed 4 minutes before scheduled shut down on its fourth burn. On 10 December 2012, specialists from Thales Alenia Space carried out maneuvers to bring the satellite into its designated orbit after a premature separation from Briz-M. On 15 December 2012, Yamal-402 was taken to its planned geostationary orbit at the altitude of 36,000 km following a series of four adjustment operations. The satellite lost 4 years of fuel to compensate for lower than expected orbit injection.

In 2013, Gazprom Board decides a new plan. It requires two new satellites: Yamal-501 and Yamal-601. It also calls for a new seven spacecraft observation constellation of optical and radar low Earth orbit satellites called SMOTR. And also requires for Gazprom Space Systems to develop its own satellite design and manufacturing capabilities.

In 2014, Gazprom announces a contract with Thales Alenia Space for a new satellite, Yamal-601. On 5 June 2014, Yamal 201 failed and the clients had to be moved to other satellites of the network. The satellite lasted 3846 days (10 years and 6.5 months), short of the design life of 12.5 years. On 15 December 2014, at 00:16:00 UTC a Proton-M / Briz-M launches Yamal-401 directly to geostationary orbit. The launch is successful and the spacecraft is accepted into service.

In 2015, history has repeated itself and the contract of Yamal-601 with Thales is cancelled and is assigned to ISS Reshetnev, but Thales is allowed to keep the payload supply, again. As a result of another change of decision, Thales Alenia Space was entrusted with the construction of the Yamal-601 entire system (satellite bus + payload). In the end, Thales Alenia Space developed and built the whole Yamal-601 satellite, both satellite bus and payload.

Yamal satellite series

See also 

 Telecommunications in Russia
 Gazprom Space Systems – Satellite communication division of the Russian oil giant Gazprom and owner of the Yamal system
 Russian Satellite Communications Company – Satellite communication company of the Ministry of Telecom and Mass Communications of the Russian Federation and the only other Russian satellite operator

References

External links 
 JSC Gazprom Space Systems

Communications satellites of Russia
Gazprom Space Systems